C56 31 was the 31st of the Class C56 steam locomotives produced by Japanese Government Railways (JGR). It was manufactured by Nippon Sharyo in 1936 and was operated on the Nanao Line in Ishikawa Prefecture before the war. C56 31 was the first locomotive to run on the Thai-Burma Railway, also known as the Death Railway. It operated there during the war, after which it was used in Thailand. After the war it was brought back to Japan and restored, and is now displayed in the Yūshūkan, the museum attached to Yasukuni Shrine in Tokyo. It is displayed without reference to the deaths during the construction of the railway, which are estimated at around 100,000.

Wartime use
In 1942, C56 31 was shipped to Thailand. It was one of 90 Japanese steam locomotives sent south to regions occupied by Japan. It was used in the opening ceremony for the Thai-Burma railway and was the first locomotive to officially run on the railway.

Postwar use and return to Japan
After the war it was used by the State Railway of Thailand. It was due to be retired in 1977, when plans were made to return it to Japan by an association of Southern Army Field Railway Corps officials. In 1979, it was returned to Japan.

Display at Yūshūkan museum
It has been displayed at the Yūshūkan museum at Yasukuni Shrine since 1979, where there is a volunteer group dedicated to preserving it. The fact that it is displayed without references to the atrocities carried out on the Thai-Burma railway has attracted criticism, particularly from people from Australia and the US.

References

Metre gauge steam locomotives
Steam locomotives of Japan
2-6-0 locomotives
Preserved steam locomotives of Japan
Individual locomotives of Japan